Bullhead Lake is located in Glacier National Park, in the U. S. state of Montana. Mount Wilbur is North of Bullhead Lake.

See also
List of lakes in Glacier County, Montana

References

Lakes of Glacier National Park (U.S.)
Lakes of Glacier County, Montana